The High Speed Rail (Preparation) Act 2013 is an Act of Parliament in the United Kingdom which allows expenditure on essential preparatory work, including construction design, on Phase One and Phase Two of HS2 and all future phases of a high speed rail network. The Act was the first stage in constructing High Speed 2.

The Hybrid Bill enabling Phase One of the project received Royal Assent on 3 February 2017.

References 

High-speed railway lines in the United Kingdom
United Kingdom Acts of Parliament 2013
High Speed 2
Railway Acts